The 1984 World Series of Poker (WSOP) was a series of poker tournaments held at Binion's Horseshoe.

Preliminary events

Main Event
There were 132 entrants to the main event. Each paid $10,000 to enter the tournament. The 1984 Main Event was the first of three consecutive final table appearances for Jesse Alto.

Final table

World Series of Poker
World Series of Poker